Erin David Bigler (born July 9, 1949) is an American neuropsychologist and the Susa Young Gates Professor at Brigham Young University (BYU), where he is a professor of psychology and neuroscience. He is known for his neuroimaging research. He was president of the National Academy of Neuropsychology from 1989 to 1990 and of the International Neuropsychological Society from 2014 to 2015. He founded the Brain Imaging and Behavior Laboratory at BYU in 1990, and chaired the Psychology Department there from 1996 to 2002. He has been the first director of BYU's Magnetic Resonance Imaging Research Facility since 2013.

References

Living people
1949 births
American neuroscientists
21st-century American psychologists
Neuropsychologists
Brigham Young University faculty
Brigham Young University alumni
20th-century American psychologists